Buschjost Magnetventile GmbH & Co. KG  is a German multinational electronics services company, headquartered in Vlotho-Exter, Germany.

History 
Buschjost Magnetventile GmbH & Co. KG was founded on 10 December 1998 by Fritz Buschjost and Marc Langejürgen in Bad Oeynhausen - Northrhine Westphalia, Germany. Thanks to Fritz Buschjost, son of a so-called fittings dynasty which was founded in the year 1933 and known far beyond the frontiers at that time we can look back on many decades of experience in the field of valve technology. Fritz Buschjost died on 10 January 2000 and Edith Buschjost took up his legal succession.

On 18 May 2001, GSR Ventiltechnik GmbH & Co. KG took over the majority interest in this company and thus has become their holding company and partner. Since 1999 GSR has been a member of :de:Indus Holding AG who are focusing on the acquisition of sound medium-sized enterprises. Their objective is to hold those companies in the long term, to develop them from a strategic point of view and to safeguard their business culture.

In that same year the company seat was transferred from Bad Oeynhausen, Turmstraße 50 to Vlotho-Exter, ImMeisenfeld 5.

Operations 
Marc Langejürgen is the Managing Director of Buschjost Magnetventile (Solenoid Valves) GmbH & Co. KG.
Buschjost valves are used in the machine building and plant engineering field, in the environmental and energy sector, in the water resources management and in gas processing, and cooling technology.

References

External links
 

Manufacturing companies of Germany
Machine manufacturers
German companies established in 1998
Manufacturing companies established in 1998